Dream Street is the debut album by American boyband Dream Street. It was released on October 31, 2000, by Edel America Records.

Track listing
Credits adapted from Apple Music metadata.

Charts

Weekly charts

Year-end charts

Notes

References

2000 debut albums
Edel Music albums
Teen pop albums